Apamea or Apameia was a Hellenistic city in Media founded by Seleucus I Nicator, near Laodicea (now Nahavand, Iran) and Heraclea.  (Strabo xi. p. 524 ; Stephanus of Byzantium "Laodikeia").  Apamea's precise location is not known, but it was located near Nahavand.Apamea is old Phrygien Kelainai in Afyonkarahisar Province Turkey.(Near Leodekia-Denizli Province)

See also
 List of ancient Greek cities

Seleucid colonies
Former populated places in Iran
Hamadan Province